The Brisons  (meaning breaker island) is a twin-peaked islet in the Celtic Sea situated 1 mile (1.6 km) offshore from Cape Cornwall in Cornwall, United Kingdom.

Geography
The rocks are connected to Gribba Point (meaning head of the reefs) by the Guthen Gwidden reef (meaning white hidden one). The gap in the reef is called the Adgiwar Gap (meaning green gap). In 1878, an article in the Cornishman newspaper names the reef between the ″Brissons″ and the land as Bridges, and the reef had three gaps; the nearest known as Rose-an-pons.

Wildlife and ecology
In  2016 the rocks were visited by the West Cornwall Ringing Group where they heard at least two European storm petrel (Hydrobates pelagicus) calling; an indication of breeding on the only known site in Cornwall. Sixty-six birds were ringed:
 European shag (Phalacrocorax aristotelis) – 42 including two adults
 razorbill (Alca torda) – 13 including seven adults
 guillemot (Uria aalge) – 11 including eight adults.

History
In 1851, the 250 ton brig New Commercial was wrecked, striking the ledge between the Great and Little Brisons. A dramatic rescue of the surviving crew was attempted, resulting in the death of all but two of the members. As a result, the National Institution for the Preservation of Life from Shipwreck (later the RNLI) established a lifeboat in Sennen Cove in 1853, where one is still based today.

Recreation
During "Cape sports" an annual water sports event based on the beach at Cape Cornwall, swimming races are conducted from the Brisons back to the beach.

References

Gallery 

Landforms of Cornwall
Penwith
Reefs of the Atlantic Ocean
Reefs of England
Seabird colonies
Uninhabited islands of Cornwall
St Just in Penwith
Celtic Sea